Boakay Eddie Foday (born 25 May 1986) is a Liberian professional footballer who plays as a striker.

Clubs career
Boakay was born in Monrovia, Liberia.

Persiwa Wamena
Boakay joined Persiwa Wamena in 2005. In the 2009–10 season he became the club's captain. Boakay played in 173 games and scored 77 goals with this club. He left the club in 2012 to join Sriwijaya.

Sriwijaya
On 28 November 2012, Boakay signed a contract with Sriwijaya.

Persipura
Later in January 2014, he signed a contract with Persipura Jayapura and said it was his dream come true to play with them.

Yadanarbon FC
On 19 November 2014, Boakay transferred to Yadanarbon FC, which will participate in the 2015 AFC Champions League play-offs for their first time. He signed for the Myanmar National League (MNL) Champion with a one-year contract.

International career
He is also a member of the Liberia national football team.

Honours

Club honors
Sriwijaya
Indonesian Inter Island Cup: 2012

References

External links
BLI Badan Liga Indonesia
Boikai Foday Profile – Fifa.com

1986 births
Living people
Liberian footballers
Association football forwards
Expatriate footballers in Indonesia
Sportspeople from Monrovia
Liga 1 (Indonesia) players
Persiwa Wamena players
Liberian expatriates in Indonesia
Sriwijaya F.C. players
Persipura Jayapura players
Persija Jakarta players
Yadanarbon F.C. players
Expatriate footballers in Myanmar
Liberia international footballers